Jean-Yves Randriamarozaka (born 8 April 1975) is a retired Malagasy football striker.

References

1975 births
Living people
Malagasy footballers
Madagascar international footballers
DSA Antananarivo players
Association football forwards